Scorpio (Latin for "scorpion") is the eighth astrological sign in the zodiac, originating from the constellation of Scorpius. It spans 210–240° ecliptic longitude. Under the tropical zodiac (most commonly used in Western astrology), the Sun transits this sign on average from October 23 to November 21. Depending on which zodiac system one uses, someone born under the influence of Scorpio may be called a Scorpio or a Scorpionic.

Associations
Scorpio is one of the water signs, the others being Cancer and Pisces. It is a fixed, negative sign. Scorpio is associated with three different animals: the scorpion, the snake, and the eagle. According to The Astrology Bible, Scorpio's colors are deep red, maroon, black, and brown.

Gallery

See also

Astronomical symbols
Chinese zodiac
Circle of stars
Cusp (astrology)
Elements of the zodiac

References

Works cited

 Longitude of Sun, apparent geocentric ecliptic of date, interpolated to find time of crossing 0°, 30°....

External links

 

Western astrological signs
Mythological arthropods